Camargo Township is one of nine townships in Douglas County, Illinois, USA.  As of the 2010 census, its population was 3,585 and it contained 1,577 housing units.

Geography
The Embarras River flows through the township. The township contains Spring Lake.

Cities, towns, villages
 Camargo
 Villa Grove

Unincorporated towns
 Patterson Springs at

Cemeteries
The township contains these three cemeteries: Broadus, Hammett and Oak Ridge.

Major highways
  U.S. Route 36
  Illinois Route 130

Demographics

School districts
 Tuscola Community Unit School District 301
 Villa Grove Community Unit School District 302

Political districts
 State House District 110
 State Senate District 55

References
 
 United States Census Bureau 2009 TIGER/Line Shapefiles
 United States National Atlas

External links
 City-Data.com
 Illinois State Archives
 Township Officials of Illinois

Townships in Douglas County, Illinois
Townships in Illinois